Shavit (meaning comet) may refer to:

People

Surname
 Ari Shavit (born 1957), Israeli reporter and writer
 Bradley Shavit Artson (born 1959), American rabbi
 Dorit Shavit (born 1949), Israeli ambassador
 Edna Shavit (1935–2015), Israeli theater professor
 Ilan Shavit (born 1958), Israeli lawyer and entrepreneur
 Isaiah Shavitt, American chemist
 Nir Shavit, Israeli computer scientist
 Ori Shavit, Israeli writer
 Raz Shavit, Israeli football player
 Shabtai Shavit (born 1939), Director of Mossad 1989–1996
 Sivan Shavit (born 1967), Israeli singer and actress
 Tzipi Shavit (born 1947), Israeli actress and entertainer
 Uriya Shavit (born 1975), Israeli author
 Yaacov Shavit (born 1944), Israeli professor
 Zohar Shavit, Israeli professor

Given name
 Shavit Ben-Arie (born 1985), history writer
 Shavit Elimelech (born 1971), Israeli football player
 Shavit Kimchi (born 2002), Israeli tennis player
 Shavit Matias, Israeli international law and globalization expert

Other
 Shavit, Iran
 Shavit 2, an Israeli lift launch vehicle first used in 1982
 Shavit 2 (sounding rocket), a 1961 Israeli sounding rocket